Justin Riveagh Connolly (11 August 1933 – 29 September 2020) was a British composer and teacher.

Life 
Justin Connolly was born on 11 August 1933 in London. He was the son of John D'Arcy-Dawson, a journalist and author, and his wife Barbara (née Little). He changed his surname from D'Arcy-Dawson to that of his father's biological father in his early 20s.

He was educated at Westminster School, went on to national service in the Army, and briefly studied law at the Middle Temple before deciding on a career in music. From 1958 he studied at the Royal College of Music – composition with Peter Racine Fricker, piano with Lamar Crowson and conducting with Sir Adrian Boult – graduating with a BMus degree. At the same time he had informal contact with Roberto Gerhard. From 1963 to 1965 he attended Yale University on a Harkness Fellowship, where he studied with Mel Powell. He subsequently taught at Yale for 18 months before returning to the UK in 1967. He taught for many years at the Royal College of Music, later moving to the Royal Academy of Music, retiring from teaching in 1995.

Justin Connolly died on 29 September 2020, in London.

Compositional career 

His music is published by Novello & Co (Wise Music Group).

Performers of his music have included conductors David Atherton, Pierre Boulez, who premiered one of his orchestra works, Norman Del Mar, Sir Charles Groves, Roger Norrington, David Porcelijn, soloists Ronald K. Anderson, Jane Manning, Gillian Weir, Ralph Kirshbaum, Frederick Riddle, Bertram Turetzky, Harry Sparnaay, John Wallace, Susan Bradshaw, Stephen Savage, Nicolas Hodges, Marilyn Nonken, Chisato Kusunoki, as well as the London Symphony Orchestra, BBC Symphony Orchestra, Royal Philharmonic Orchestra, Bournemouth Symphony Orchestra, London Sinfonietta, the Nash Ensemble and the Pierrot Players.

Connolly was highly regarded as a teacher. His students included Minna Keal, Geoffrey King, Andrew McBirnie, Alwynne Pritchard and Kevin Raftery.

Style 

Of Connolly's early music, Anthony Payne wrote (in 1971):

On arrival in the US, Connolly's development was swift, such that Anthony Gilbert (writing in 2012) could describe the premieres of Antiphonies and Poems of Wallace Stevens I in the late 60s both as "electrifying". His subsequent music continues the outwardly modernist idiom, rigorously crafted: glittering, sometimes pointillist, often concerned with the interplay of complex and detailed textures. Some works refer to dance forms, and often a dance-like energy contributes to the forward propulsion (Cinquepaces, Antiphonies, Ceilidh, Canaries); at the same time his music often explores ideas related to philosophy, literature and history, with even non-vocal works sometimes having their roots in poetry (Sestina A and B, Sonatina II: Ennead, Tesserae F). Others yet refer to the composer's strong affinity with the music of the nineteenth century, such as the Tesserae series of works, all based on a hymn-tune by Parry, or his several arrangements of works by Brahms.

Connolly mature output has been described as "characterized by clear groupings, by massive overall integrity, and by movement upwards, inwards and outwards towards the op. 42 Piano Concerto of 2001-3". He composed works in all genres apart from opera. His purely orchestral works are limited to earlier works (Antiphonies, op. 4, Obbligati for orchestra (1966)), but both incorporate spatialise orchestras. Anthony Gilbert described Antiphonies thus:

After these works, Connolly's orchestral output concentrated on the dramatic possibilities inherent in the concerto form: Anima written for violist Frederick Riddle, Diaphony for organ and orchestra written for Gillian Weir, and the aforementioned Piano Concerto written for Nicolas Hodges (the result of a BBC commission, premièred in 2003). He also wrote a large concertante work for the London Sinfonietta, Obbligati III, with solo clarinet, trumpet and cor anglais.

Connolly was known for his sensitive and dramatic setting of poetry throughout his output. He composed four cycles to poems by Wallace Stevens, also setting Henry Vaughan, George Seferis, Sappho, Drummond of Hawthornden, Thomas Traherne, Friederich Hölderlin. Poems of Wallace Stevens II has been described as follows:

Chamber works include a brass quintet Cinquepaces, cycles such as the six Tesserae and six Triads all for different soloists or groupings, as well as solo works such as three Sonatinas for piano solo, and solo works for bass clarinet, flute, viola and cello.

Between 1968 and 1971 Connolly collaborated extensively with Peter Zinovieff at the Putney EMS studio, producing six works. Of these only Tesserae D for trumpet and tape is available for performance. Anthony Payne chose to end his early survey of Connolly's work by describing this corner of his output:

He also composed Triad VI for viola, piano and tape, with the collaboration of Lawrence Casserley.

List of completed works 
 Sonatina in Five Studies, Op. 1, piano, 1962, rev.1983
 Triad I, Op. 2, tpt, vla, pno, 1964
 Obbligati I, Op. 3, 13 instruments, 1966
 Antiphonies, Op. 4, orchestra, 1966
 Cinquepaces, Op. 5, brass quintet, 1965
 Triad IIa, Op. 6/I, dbass, perc, piano, 1965
 Triad IIb, Op. 6/II, dbass, perc, piano, 1982
 Prose, Op. 7a, SATB, 1967
 Verse, Op. 7b, SSAATTBB, 1969
 Triad III, Op. 8, ob, va, vc, 1966
 Poems of Wallace Stevens I, Op. 9, S, 7 insts, 1967
 M-piriform, Op. 10, S, vln, fl, tape, 1968 (with Peter Zinovieff)
 The Garden of Forking Paths, Op. 11a, piano duet, 1969
 Fourfold, for two pianos, Op. 11b, 1983, from The Garden of Forking Paths 
 Triad IV, Op. 12, fl, 2 perc, tape, 1969
 Obbligati II, Op. 13, fl, cl, vln, vcl, piano, tape, 1969 (with Peter Zinovieff)
 Poems of Wallace Stevens II, Op. 14, S, cl, pno, 1970
 Tesserae A, Op. 15/I, ob, hpd, 1968, rev. ob, pno, 1983
 Tesserae B, Op. 15/II, fl, pf, 1970
 Tesserae C, Op. 15/III, cello solo, 1971
 Tesserae D, Op. 15/IV, tpt, tape, 1971
 Tesserae E, Op. 15/V, fl, db, 1972
 Tesserae F, Op. 15/VI, bass clarinet solo, 1999
 Poems of Henry Vaughan, Op. 16, 1&3: SATB. 2: SSATB, 1970
 Rebus, Op. 17, orch., 1971 (lost presumed destroyed)
 Poems of Wallace Stevens III, Op. 18, sop, pno, tape 1971
 Triad V, Op. 19, cl, vln, vc, 1971
 Obbligati III, Op. 20, 20 inst., 1971 (commissioned by the London Sinfonietta, premiere April 14, 1971)
 Triad VI, Op. 21, vla, pf, tape, 1974
 Tetramorph, Op. 22, strings, tape, 1972
 Divisions, Op. 23, wind band, 1972
 Waka, Op. 24, mezzo, pf, 1972, rev. 1981
 Sestina A, Op. 25a, pf, fl, ob, cl, hn, bsn, 1972 (lost)
 Sestina B, Op. 25b, fl, ob, bcl, vln, vc, hpsd, 1972, rev. 1978
 Sonatina No. 2: Ennead, Op. 26, piano, 2000
 Anima, Op. 27, vla, orch, 1974
 Obbligati IV, Op. 28, ensemble, 1974
 Ceilidh, Op. 29/I, 4 vln, 1976
 Celebratio super Ter in lyris Leo, Op. 29/II, 3 vla, accordion, 1994
 Collana, Op. 29/III, vc, 1995
 Celebratio per viola sola, Op. 29/IV, 2005
 Diaphony, Op. 31, organ and orchestra, 1977
 Spelt from Sibyl's Leaves, Op. 32, 5 voices, ensemble (3hn, 2 hp, pno, bgtr, 2perc), 1989
 Nocturnal, Op. 33, fl, pf, cb, perc, 1991
 Sapphic, Op. 35, S, 12 players (fl, ob, bcl, tpt, trb, 2perc, 2 vln, vla, vlc, cb), 1991
 Piano Trio - MK Lives!, Op. 36, 1999 (lost)
 Scardanelli Dreams, Op. 37, MS, pf, 1997-8
 Poems of Wallace Stevens IV, Op. 38, MS, vla, pno, 1992
 Gymel A, Op. 39a, fl, cl, 1993
 Gymel B, Op. 39b, clarinet, cello, 1995
 Remembering the butterfly..., Op. 40a, fl, pf, 1998
 Silbo, Op. 40b, piccolo and piano, 2009
 Piano Concerto, Op. 42, piano and orchestra, 2001-3
 String Trio, Op. 43, 2009–10
 Canaries, Op. 44, wind quintet, 2004
 Sonatina Scherzosa, Op. 45, piano, 2015
 DOG/GOD, Op. 48, for voice and tape, 2017

No opus number:

 Variations, tape, 1968
 Chimaera, dancer, 2 voices, and saxophone quartet, 1979, rev. for dancer, alto, bar., ch., pf., perc., and vc. 1981 (lost)
 Brahms: Variations Op. 23, arranged for wind band, 1985
 MPF – his rebus, for solo piano, 1996
 Scherzetti, solo flute, 2020

Discography 
 Poems of Wallace Stevens I / Verse / Cinquepaces / Triad III, Argo LP ZRG 747 (1973), Lyrita CD SRCD305 (2008)
 Night Thoughts: Sonatina No. 2: Ennead, Nocturnal, Tesserae F: "Domination in Black", Scardanelli Dreams.
 Tesserae D, John Wallace, trumpet, Soma 781 (LP)
 MK lives! [early version of Piano Trio, op.36], Minna Keal 90th Birthday Concert (private release)
 Poems of Wallace Stevens II, Jane Manning, Jane's Minstrels, NMC D025
 Sonatina in Five Studies, Steven Neugarten, piano, Metier MSV CD92008
 Remembering the Butterfly..., op.40, Mark Underwood / Justin Connolly, Piping Hot, Chromattica 0500 (2000)

Bibliography 
 Anon, Justin Connolly, composer brochure with biography and worklist, Novello and Co. Ltd., January 1992 
 Connolly, Justin, "Cardew's 'The Great Digest' and Gilbert's 'Missa Brevis'" Tempo, No. 86 (Autumn, 1968), pp. 16–17
 Connolly, Justin, Review of LPs by Carter, Sessions etc, Tempo No. 105 (June 1973), 40-41
 Connolly, Justin, Havergal Brian review, Tempo No. 167 (August 2000)
 Connolly, Justin, The Songs of Bernard van Dieren, diss., U. of London, 1978
 Connolly, Justin, Preface to Beethoven Symphony no. 6 in F major, op. 68, 'Pastorale', Eulenburg audio+score, 2007
 Connolly, Justin, Preface to Beethoven 9th Symphony, Op. 125, Eulenburg audio+score, 2007
 Connolly, Justin, Preface to Schumann 3rd Symphony, Op. 97, Eulenburg audio+score, 2007
 Connolly, Justin, Preface to Symphony no. 8 D944, 'Great', Eulenburg audio+score, 2007
 Conway, Paul, "London, BBC Maida Vale Studios: Justin Connolly's Piano Concerto" Tempo, Vol. 58, No. 228 (Apr., 2004), pp. 66–67
 Ford, Andrew, Interview with Pierre Boulez, Composer to composer, Hale & Iremonger, 1993, p. 21
 Gilbert, Anthony, "Kaleidoscopes and a labyrinth – the musical vision of Justin Connolly", Tempo, Volume 66, Issue 260 (April 2012), pp. 15–22 
 Hodges, Nicolas, "Justin Connolly", New Grove, Second Edition
 Kenyon, Nicholas, The BBC Symphony Orchestra: 1930-1980, London: BBC, 1981, pp370–1 (discussion of circumstances surrounding premiere of Tetramorph)
 Kurowski, Andrew, Justin Connolly in Interview, Tempo, Volume 77, Issue 303, January 2023, pp. 43-57 
 McBirnie, Andrew, Obituary of Justin Connolly, The Guardian, 1 November 2020, https://www.theguardian.com/music/2020/nov/01/justin-connolly-obituary
 Oliver, Michael, 'Miscellany' in British Music Now, ed. Lewis Foreman (1975), pp. 162–178, esp. pp. 162–164
 Padmore, Susan, Interview with Justin Connolly on Spelt from Sibyl's leaves (BBC Radio 3 broadcast, 1989)
 Payne, Anthony, "Justin Connolly", New Grove (1st edition)
 
 Potter, Keith and Villars, Chris, "Interview with Justin Connolly". Contact, 1 (1971). pp. 16–20. ISSN 0308-5066. 
 Wolf, Benjamin, "The SPNM 1943–1975: a retrospective", The Musical Times, Vol. 154, No. 1925 (WINTER 2013), pp. 47–66

References

External links 
 
 Page at Wise Music website – contains photograph, biography and list of published works

1933 births
2020 deaths
20th-century classical composers
21st-century classical composers
British classical composers
British male classical composers
People educated at Westminster School, London
Academics of the Royal Academy of Music
Alumni of the Royal College of Music
Academics of the Royal College of Music
20th-century British composers
20th-century British male musicians
21st-century British male musicians